Port Talbot is a town and community in the county borough of Neath Port Talbot, Wales, situated on the east side of Swansea Bay, approximately  from Swansea. The town has been described by valleys culture druid and Welsh football influencer Evan Powell as "the gateway to Swansea" and "a proper working class town". The Port Talbot Steelworks covers a large area of land which dominates the south east of the town and is one of the biggest steelworks in the world but has been under threat of closure since the 1980s. The population was 31,550 in 2021, comprising about a fifth of the 141,931 population of Neath Port Talbot.

History
Modern Port Talbot is a town formed from the merging of multiple villages, including Baglan, Margam, and Aberafan. The name 'Port Talbot' first appears in 1837 as the name of the new docks built on the south-east side of the river Afan by the Talbot family. Over time it came to be applied to the whole of the emerging conurbation.

The earliest evidence of humans in the Port Talbot area has been found on the side of Mynydd Margam where Bronze Age farming ditches can be found from 4,000 BC. There were Iron Age hill forts on Mynydd Dinas, Mynydd Margam, Mynydd Emroch and other nearby hills. Mynydd Hawdef contains remains of an ancient Iron Age village. The Margam deer herd was first introduced by the Romans.

Ffynnon Pedr is a holy well which flows from the hillside through a  stone culvert in Margam. This may have been a water supply for Margam Abbey,  to the east.

The Cross of Brancuf an early Christian Sculptured Stone which stands in the church of St Catharine at Baglan. It is an intricately sculptured cross-slab with a Latin cross and an inscription recalling Brancuf. Originally it stood in the old St Baglan's church but that fell into ruin in the late 19th century and the slab was removed to St Catharine's. St Baglan (Bagelan), son of King Ithael Hoel of Brittany, was a 6th-century hermit and follower of St Illtud. He founded the first church at the town that now takes his name. In the vestry of St Catharine's church a cross-slab dating from the 8th–10th century CE. It is intricately decorated with a Celtic-style cross formed out of knotwork (cord-plait knotwork) and interlacing; the ends of each arm are probably of a Latin design. Also, there is a Latin inscription: FECIT BRANCUF or perhaps BRANCU which when translated reads 'was made by Brancuf'. However, the person known as Brancuf is unknown.

The English antiquarian John Leland made an extensive journey through Wales c.1536–39 of which he recorded an itinerary. He passed through Aberafan, which he describes as a "poor village" surrounded by barren ground, though he also describes the area as heavily wooded, not much of which remains today. He mentions the use of the river mouth as a port. His portrayal of Aberafan as a small, struggling village suggests that the port was not in great use, especially as traffic to and from Margam Abbey would have ceased following its dissolution in 1536.

The area of the parish of Margam lying on the west bank of the lower Afan became industrialised following the establishment of a copperworks in 1770. The Afan was diverted and a dock was opened in 1839 named for the Talbot family, local landowners who were related to the pioneer photographer, William Henry Fox Talbot. The Talbots were patrons of Margam Abbey, and also built Margam Castle. Christopher Rice Mansel Talbot (1803–1890), a Liberal Member of Parliament (MP) for Glamorgan from 1830 until his death, saw the potential of his property as a site for an extensive ironworks, which opened in early 1831.

The remains of a Chain Home Low early warning radar station are situated in Margam Country Park, dating from World War II. Designed to guard against enemy surface craft and submarines in the Bristol Channel, the station comprises three squarish concrete buildings with flat roofs, set on the Margam ridge facing south-east and overlooking the Channel. The most north-westerly building retains the framework of a steel gantry, the base for a rectangular radar transmitter/receiver array, known as a 'bedstead array' from its wires and framework, and is believed to be a unique survivor within the British Isles.

In 1970 a new deep-water harbour was opened by Queen Elizabeth II and the Duke of Edinburgh. This harbour was capable of discharging iron ore vessels of 100,000 deadweight tonnage (DWT), a tenfold improvement on the old dock. By the early 21st century, due to further modification and dredging, the harbour is capable of harbouring vessels of over 170,000 DWT.

Governance

The borough of Port Talbot was created in November 1921, incorporating Margam, Cwmafan and Aberafan. It was therefore 85 years after the phrase 'Port Talbot' was first used that it became officially recognised as the town's name.

Port Talbot was part of the historic county of Glamorgan. The 1974 county council re-organisation split Glamorgan into three new counties, and Port Talbot became one of the four districts of West Glamorgan.

Following the demise of West Glamorgan County Council in 1996, Port Talbot borough council was merged with Neath and part of Lliw Valley Districts to create the new unitary authority of Neath Port Talbot County Borough. The Civic Centre is located in Port Talbot, and the town is represented by three of the 64 councillors that make up the county council.

The centre of the town is covered by the Port Talbot ward for local council elections.

Physical geography

Port Talbot occupies an area of low lying coastal plain between Swansea Bay to the west (within the Bristol Channel) and the hills and valleys of Margam Moors (which are part of the wider South Wales valleys) to the south. The town is built along the eastern rim of Swansea Bay in a narrow strip of coastal plain surrounding the River Afan estuary. Swansea is visible on the opposite side of the bay. The local beach is known as Aberafan Sands and is situated along the edge of the bay between the River Afan and the River Neath. The other beach in Port Talbot is Margam Sands, popularly known as Morfa Beach. The north-eastern edge of the town is marked by the River Neath. A landmark in the town is the Port Talbot Steelworks.

Human geography
With heavy industry and an urban motorway, Port Talbot was reported as having the worst air pollution in Wales in 2005 with a PM10 particulate level of 30μg/m3 (micrograms per cubic metre). By 2018 the air quality had improved to meet the WHO's recommended limit of 10μg/m3.

According to the Office for National Statistics, the Neath Port Talbot population had increased by 1.8%, from around 139,800 in 2011 to 142,300 in 2021. This was higher than the overall increase for Wales (1.4%), where the population grew by 44,000 to 3,107,500. In 2021, Neath Port Talbot ranked ninth for total population out of 22 local authority areas in Wales - a fall of one place in a decade. As of 2021, Neath Port Talbot was the 11th least densely populated of Wales' 22 local authority areas, with around two people living on each football pitch-sized area of land. There had been an increase of 15.5% in people aged 65 years and over, a decrease of 2.3% in people aged 15 to 64 years, and an increase of 2.5% in children aged under 15 years.

Of Port Talbot's population in 2000, 63% were between the ages of 15 and 64. Male unemployment in 2000 was around 9%, with female unemployment around 6% in 2000.

Social deprivation
In 2010, 26.2% of children and young persons (under the age of 20) in Neath Port Talbot county borough were living in relative poverty, higher than the 22.2% Welsh average.

According to the Office of National Statistics between April 2012 to March 2013 25,400 (7.8%) between the ages of 16–64 were economically inactive, 60,100 (70.3%) between the ages of 16–64 were economically active. The unemployment rate was 7.8% and the employment rate was 64.9%.

Geology
Port Talbot has a variety of bedrock and drift types.

Bedrock geology
South East of Port Talbot is dominated by Pennant sandstone which forms this high relief area including Mynydd Margam, Mynydd Dinas and the other mountains. The pennant sandstone is made up of two formations which are the Rhondda Member and Brithdir Member. The sandstone formed in Carboniferous swamps 300 million years ago. Pennant sandstone is a micacous sandstone which has a brown colouration with areas of red staining where iron from pyrite in coal has weathered creating a rust colouration.

Lower land areas are predominantly Pennant sandstone within the South Wales Coal Measures Group.

Drift geology
There is a variety of drift deposits in Port Talbot. Sandfields area of Port Talbot is built upon blown sand and tidal flat deposits. These were deposited by the wind via aeolian processes and the water by fluvial processes. Velindre area of Port Talbot is built upon an alluvial fan deposit. This deposit formed during the last glacial period 14,000 years ago. Baglan Road in Port Talbot is built upon glacial till from the Devensian period. Till, also known as boulder clay, is a mix of unconsolidated sediment with a range of grain sizes. This forms as the fronts of glaciers rapidly deposit material due to melting. Cwmafan in Port Talbot is built upon alluvial and glaciofluvial deposits, formed from glacial meltwater. Baglan Moors, Fairfield and Port Talbot town centre are built upon tidal flat deposits (tides were higher 12,000 years ago allowing sandy deposits to accumulate).

Economic geology
Coal seams within the Pennant sandstone run north west-south-east and east–west. The coal seams arise from the South Wales Middle Coal Measures Formation, South Wales Upper Coal Measures Formation, South Wales Lower Coal Measures Formation, Rhondda Member and Brithdir Member. Pennant sandstone is an excellent construction rock and road stone.

Structural geology
Faults have an orientation of North West-South East, east–west and north–south. All are normal faults which form extension processes. There are also many marine fossils bands.

Bio-stratigraphy/palaeontology
Marine fossils found in Port Talbot region include species of bivalves, gastropods and brachiopods. Terrestrial fossils include fern tree branches, trunks, leaves and roots. Traces of organism footprints can also be found.

Engineering geology
Several landslips occur in the highlands including many bole holes historically made for the construction of the M4 motorway, steelworks and coal mines.

Hydro-geology 
Rivers in the region are fault guided meaning that they flow is highly influenced by a structural weakness called a fault. Several natural springs occur in the highland regions with a neutral to slightly acidic ph values. Rivers in the region including the River Afan (Aberafan), River Neath (Baglan Bay), Ffrwdwyllt (Taibach), Arnallt Brook (Taibach), Baglan Brook (Baglan), River Kenfig (Morfa Beach) and other rivers are fast flowing and are highly influenced by their mouths (end of the rivers, tidal region). A spout can be found in Baglan Park in the Baglan region of Port Talbot. Many open and uncovered reservoirs exist in the region. Water has been channelled into ditches in industrial areas of Port Talbot. Source of the River Kenfig is in Mynydd Margam then flows in a broadly westerly direction and has a series of meanders on the low-lying land of Margam Moors and discharges into the Swansea Bay. The River Afan lies flows broadly west and discharges into Swansea Bay. The River Ffrwdywllt passes beneath the M4 motorway, flows through Port Talbot then at the A4241 it enters a culvert beneath the road, and then emerges to the north of Port Talbot Docks, and ultimately discharges into the docks. The Arnallt Brook passes beneath the M4 motorway and flows through Margam and enters a culvert at the A4241. From here it is culverted through Port Talbot Steelworks as the Arnallt Culvert then ultimately discharges onto Margam Sands at the Abbey Beach Outfall. Margam Moors is drained by a network of drainage ditches (reens). The reens discharge into three ‘main’ drains; the Upper Mother Ditch, the Middle Mother Ditch and the Lower Mother Ditch. The Middle Mother Ditch and the Lower Mother Ditch flow northwards along the eastern boundary of Port Talbot steelworks, where they intercept drainage from a reen network around the Eglwys Nunydd Reservoir. The two drains converge near the Port Talbot steelworks eastern boundary and are culverted beneath the site which combines with the Arnallt Culvert and discharges at the Abbey Beach Outfall. The Upper Mother Ditch appears to flow into the operational works area where OS mapping indicates a ditch like feature which flows partially in an open channel towards Port Talbot Steelworks. The outfall of the Upper Mother Ditch is likely to combine within the drainage system of the Port Talbot Steelworks. 

Within Port Talbot lowland areas groundwater can observed in all geological units such as Made Ground, aeolian sands or estuarine alluvium, and the second beneath a silty clay stratum in the underlying alluvial strata. The deeper groundwater was considered to be hydraulically confined by silty clay stratum; however, it was noted in the report that this silty clay confining layer strata is not present across Port Talbot. Upper Aquifers includes saturated made ground overlying alluvium / estuarine deposits; or saturated aeolian / estuarine/alluvial deposits overlying alluvium / estuarine deposits. Lower Aquifers includessaturated sand and gravel horizons within estuarine deposits at depth. Perching layer (aquiclude) is anticipated to be a clay rich estuarine or alluvial deposit and the upper perched aquifer would probably be recharged by local rainfall and site drainage. The lower aquifer would more likely be recharged by downward leakage from the upper aquifer and / or through hydraulic connection with groundwater up-gradient. The lower aquifer in the Aberavon sand dunes area was shown to be sub-artesian with piezometric surfaces being at or slightly above the clay horizon, indicating a slight upward hydraulic gradient. The lowland areas have No distinct groundwater gradient from the north to the south is very flat and the water surface horizontal. There are no known groundwater source protection zones within Port Talbot.

Marine geo-science and oceanography

Port Talbot sea floor topography ranges from  within Swansea Bay. There are many patches within the bay including the North Kenfig patches, green grounds, outer green grounds, madjoe and stalheim. These patches are created from faults, hollows, general topography and other factors. There are two beaches within Port Talbot: Aberafan and Morfa. The sand at both beaches is yellow and semi-shell rich. The tide in the area has a harmonic prediction which means it can be predicted easy and has repeatable tide heights every year. The outer bay area and sea area near Port Talbot Pier has a tidal stream with no harmonic prediction. A tidal stream (or tidal current) is an alternating horizontal movement of water associated with the rise and fall of the tide caused by tide-producing forces. This means that the tide cannot be accurately predicted due to additional factors like currents, rip current, river mouths and precipitation. There are also two major dumping grounds within the bay. These are areas where sand is collected for the construction industry. Port Talbot docks is a deep water harbour which allows large cargo ships to dock into the area.

Port Talbot is bounded on the south-west by Swansea Bay, which is part of the Bristol Channel. The following information on tidal conditions within the bay, sedimentation, morphology and bathymetry have been obtained from the Tidal Lagoon Swansea Bay Environmental Statement. Swansea Bay receives freshwater inputs from the following key rivers; Rivers Tawe, Neath, Afan, Kenfig, Ogmore and Clyne, as well as direct atmospheric sources and catchment runoff. The volume of freshwater entering the bay is also further increased by a number of effluent discharges. Swansea bay is a large south and south-easterly facing bay backed by a developed coastal plain with pockets of sparsely settled coastline, backed in part by steeply rising hills inland. There is a varied coastline between development, including estuaries (of the rivers Tawe, Neath, Afan and Kenfig), sandy bays, dunes and low limestone cliffs and pavements. The bay supports varied marine life and a range of commercial fishing activities including trawling, set netting, rod and line fishing, whelk potting and mussel seed harvesting and is a designated bivalve mollusc production area for mussels (Mytilus spp.). The tidal characteristics through the Bristol Channel are determined by a progressive tidal wave which increases in amplitude as the channel narrows into the Severn Estuary. As this progressive wave moves past the shallow side-embayment of Swansea Bay the tidal 
behaviour changes into a standing wave, exhibited by near coincident times of high water at Swansea and Port Talbot. Higher wave climate is associated with the outer parts of the bay where the shelter provided by the surrounding land diminishes, and the influence of the Bristol Channel (and associated Atlantic weather conditions), strengthens. Swansea Bay experiences a hyper-tidal range (i.e. greater than 6 m), with a mean spring tidal range of between 8.46m (Mumbles Head) and 8.60m (Port Talbot). In contrast, the mean neap tidal range within the bay is around 4m, still considerably greater than spring tidal ranges experienced in most locations elsewhere in the UK. 

The variability of tidal currents across Swansea Bay demonstrates four main areas: 
− i. Offshore, approximately beyond the 10 m below CD (-15 mODN) contour dominated by 
rectilinear flows; 
− ii. Inshore west, from Mumbles Head to Swansea Docks, dominated by the Mumbles 
headland; 
− iii. Inshore middle, between Swansea Docks and Port Talbot – relatively calm area with 
flows moving in and out of the bay; and 
− iv. Inshore east, south from Port Talbot – shore aligned flows moving towards and from 
Porthcawl Point.
• The strongest currents are in the offshore area. Here flows are typically rectilinear and are 
aligned to the axis of the Central Bristol Channel. Peak ebb currents tend to be greater than 
peak flood, indicating some asymmetry in the tide.
• Tidal flows across the inshore area from Mumbles Head to Swansea Docks are typically weaker and exhibit a rotary pattern formed around the headland. Locally, flows past Mumbles Head are stronger, diverging across the bay on the flood tide and converging back 
into the channel on the ebb. The residual pattern in the tide is an anti-clockwise circulation in the lee of the headland.
• For the inshore area between Swansea Docks and Port Talbot, which includes the River 
Neath, tidal flows are again generally weak and can be prone to wind driven effects. 
• For the area identified as inshore east, there is a further flow divergence centred on Port Talbot. Flood flows from around Port Talbot are generally to the north-east whilst flows south of Port Talbot diverge towards the south-east to become aligned to the coast and towards Sker Point. On the ebb tide, tidal flows to the south of Port Talbot are reversed to a north�westerly direction.

Sedimentation
• Between the River Neath and Port Talbot in the eastern side of Swansea Bay, fine and medium sands are found across Aberafan Sands and the shallow subtidal region is largely characterised by sand and slightly gravelly sand.
• A geophysical and geotechnical survey of the Port Talbot approach channel (Fugro, 1995b) identified that a surficial layer of mud and muddy sand is present along the channel (with occasional pockets of clay). Within the channel this surficial layer varies in thickness from approximately 1.5 m thick at the seaward end of the channel to less than 0.5m below the seabed at approximately 1.5 km from the harbour entrance. This surficial layer is then underlain by medium sands, the base of which is found at 2 to 5 m below the seabed surface. It should be highlighted that this survey was undertaken prior to a capital deepening of 2.6 m along the approach channel which occurred in 1996, and therefore the base of the maintained channel is expected to be medium sands. 
• Outside the approach channel (along its length), the subtidal benthic survey suggests that seabed sediments predominantly consist of slightly gravelly sands. 
• To the south of Port Talbot, on the eastern foreshore of the bay, the seabed sediments across Margam and Kenfig Sands comprise a thin veneer of sand, which overlies hard deposits of peat and clay.
• Within the offshore central region of Swansea Bay, around the 10 m below CD bathymetric contour the seabed sediments are coarser, comprising predominantly sandy gravels and gravels. 
• Along with sediments that are found on the seabed there are also sediments that are carried in suspension, either permanently or for short periods. Suspended sediments tend to be finer and can be carried over long distances by the tide and take a long time to fall out of suspension when conditions allow. They also have an exchange with the seabed through periods of deposition during calm events or erosion in response to higher energy events. Sources of suspended sediment may be local, or more remote from a specific area, and will 
also include contributions from rivers.

Morphology and Bathymetry
• Swansea Bay is defined by its shallow waters with its overall physical character changing markedly according to the tides – a wide intertidal zone of mudflats is exposed at low tide in the west, and maximum depths in the inner bay are of less than 10 metres. 
• Devonian and Carboniferous sandstones and mudstones are overlain by thick Holocene deposits of sand, gravel and mud – dredged to maintain port access into Swansea, the River Neath (Briton Ferry) and Port Talbot. 
• The seabed gradually deepens to a maximum of 20 metres in its outer extent, but this varies due to the presence of significant sand bars, banks and submerged rocks. 
• Scarweather Sands, Hugo Bank and Kenfig Patches guard the south-eastern entrance to the bay, their associated shoals, changing depths, overfalls and unpredictable eddies creating challenges to navigation. 
• The varied sand and rocky sediments of the seafloor, as well as the sheltered, warm conditions arising from the bay’s topography and southerly aspect, support a rich marine life.
• Subtidal region is stable at a decadal level.

Education

There are four comprehensive schools situated within the Port Talbot area:
Ysgol Cwm Brombil
St. Joseph's Catholic School & Sixth Form Centre
Ysgol Bae Baglan
Ysgol Gymraeg Ystalyfera Bro Dur – the Bro Dur campus in is Port Talbot

Glan Afan Comprehensive School and Sandfields Comprehensive School closed in 2016.

A campus of Neath Port Talbot College is located in the Margam area. The Margam campus was previously called Afan College.

The University of South Wales has a campus at Baglan Energy Park called the Hydrogen Centre, which includes a Renewable Hydrogen Research and Development Centre.

Arts and culture

South Wales Miners' Museum
The South Wales Miners' Museum is located in Cynonville, Cymmer.

Margam Stones Museum
The nearby Margam Stones Museum has early Christian inscribed stones and Celtic crosses, including four from the area now under the Steelworks. A Roman milestone, an 8th-century pillar, and two Celtic crosses from the 10th century were all rescued from the steelworks site by the Talbot family and taken to Margam, where they are now in the museum, in the care of Cadw.

The Baked Bean Museum of Excellence
The Baked Bean Museum of Excellence is a private museum in Port Talbot.

Banksy mural
In December 2018 the artist Banksy confirmed that he produced a mural painted on the corner of a garage close to Port Talbot steelworks. On one side it depicts a boy playing in what appears to be snowfall, but the other side shows the snowfall is ash falling from a bin fire. In May 2019, the mural was moved to a gallery in the town's Ty'r Orsaf building.

The Passion

In April 2011, actor Michael Sheen led a 72-hour National Theatre Wales production of a modern retelling of The Passion. The play began at 5:30 am on Good Friday with a seafront scene, inspired by John the Baptist's baptism of Jesus, which was watched by hundreds who had heard about it by word of mouth.

By the time the first main part of the play was performed on Aberafan Beach at 3:00 pm, organisers estimated up to 6,000 people had gathered to watch.

On Saturday, there were sequences in Llewellyn Street, the Castle Street underpass, Aberafan Shopping Centre, the Seaside Social and Labour Club in Sandfields and nearby Abbeyville Court.

On Easter Sunday, the production returned to Aberafan Beach as part of the finale. A trial was performed on Civic Square before a procession from Station Road, with the final scene, "the cross", at Aberafan seafront. By the time the procession had reached the seafront close to where it had begun 72 hours earlier, organisers estimate over 13,000 people had come to watch on the small roundabout.

In April 2012, Michael Sheen returned to attend the world premiere of the feature-length film The Gospel of Us based on The Passion. The premiere was held at the Apollo Cinema (now the Reel Cinema) on the Aberafan seafront close to where The Passion took place. Tickets for the premiere sold out weeks before the showing; all six screens showed the film simultaneously. The film was also shown daily from Easter Sunday to the following Thursday prior to its UK-wide release the next day.

Media
The area is served by several radio stations: The Wave (96.4 FM), Greatest Hits Radio South Wales (1170 MW), Easy Radio (102.1 FM), Heart South Wales (106.0 FM) and Nation Radio (107.3 FM), all of which are available on DAB. Radio Phoenix also operates a 24-hour hospital radio service for the patients & staff of Neath Port Talbot Hospital in Baglan Moors.

In 2005 the area was granted its first radio station when Afan FM, the inspiration of a group of local young people, was awarded a five-year licence by Ofcom to serve Port Talbot and Neath. Afan FM broadcast from the AquaDome leisure complex on Aberafan Seafront. Following a December 2009 fire at the AquaDome, Afan FM moved to Aberafan House, adjacent to the town's shopping centre. Afan FM closed in December 2011 was shut down following after an unexpected tax bill.

The town has been served by several newspapers. The Port Talbot Guardian was a weekly paper published by Media Wales, part of the Trinity Mirror group, but ceased publication in October 2009. The Swansea-based daily South Wales Evening Post and the weekly Courier and Tribune are distributed in the town and are published by Media Wales, part of the Reach plc group.

The Welsh-language song competition Cân i Gymru is usually filmed in Port Talbot. TV programmes such as Doctor Who and The Sarah Jane Adventures have filmed in the town.

The 2017 crime drama television series Bang is set in Port Talbot.

Terry Gilliam has recounted how he was inspired to create the movie Brazil after hearing a transistor radio play the song Aquarela do Brasil on the beach at Port Talbot.

Transport

Railway

Port Talbot is served by the South Wales Main Line at Port Talbot Parkway railway station.

The new £5.6 million Integrated Transport hub was completed in 2017, linking Port Talbot Parkway with new bus and taxi links. This also included extensive upgrades to the railway station and surrounding area.

Bus
Port Talbot bus station, located adjacent to the Aberafan Centre in the centre of the town is the main bus transport hub, it is a National Express stop. Local bus services are provided by First Cymru and South Wales Transport. The bus station's layout is very distinctive for the fact that buses always have to perform a 270° clockwise turn to exit the station. A Sustrans cycle route has recently been constructed at this bus station as part of the connect2 scheme connecting the Afan Valley with Aberafan beach. A second bus station opened in the town in 2017, at Port Talbot Parkway railway station.

M4 motorway
The M4 motorway passes through the town from southeast to northwest, crossing a central area on a concrete viaduct, junctions 38 to 41 serve Port Talbot, with junctions 40 and 41 being in the commercial heart of the town. This busy urban stretch of the M4, with tight bends, two-lane carriageways, short narrow slip roads and concrete walls on both sides, was the first length of motorway in Wales when it opened to traffic in 1966. The road has a speed limit of  enforced with automatic number-plate recognition speed cameras in both directions. The stretch through Port Talbot town centre is a particular traffic congestion blackspot and there have been calls to close the slip roads at junctions 40 and 41 to improve traffic flow. However some commuters oppose this plan since it would add more time to their journey. A new dual carriageway relief road, the Port Talbot Peripheral Distribution Road (PDR), was completed in 2013. It serves as a distributor road through Port Talbot to the southwest of the M4, beginning at M4 Junction 38 and ending near Junction 41.

Port Talbot docks
The Port Talbot Docks complex consist of an inner set of floating docks and an outer tidal basin. The tidal basin is capable of handling ships of up to 170,000 DWT and is used mostly for the import of iron ore and coal for use by nearby Port Talbot Steelworks. The inner floating docks were constructed in 1898 and were closed in 1959. They were re-opened in 1998 for commercial shipping and in March 2007 for the import of some steel products and are capable of handling ships of up to 8,000 dwt. There have been proposals for the development of an intermodal freight terminal at the port.

Economy

On 20 November 2007, the Department for Business, Enterprise and Regulatory Reform (BERR) granted consent for the world's largest biomass power station to be built at Port Talbot. This is expected to provide enough electricity (from wood from environmentally-managed forests, mostly in North America) to supply half the homes in Wales with electricity.

Potential future development currently centres around the peripheral distributor road to the south (the dual carriageway road in the Margam and Taibach areas was finished in 2013), Baglan Industrial Park and Baglan Energy Park to the west, Port Talbot Docks to the southwest, Margam Country Park to the east and the Afan Valley to the north. In March 2009 Neath Port Talbot County Borough Council announced a regeneration project for Port Talbot town centre and docks, with a master plan for new homes, offices, light industry, retail developments and improvements to the railway station.

In January 2021, permission was granted for a new £200m adventure resort to open in the Afan Valley. The resort will include ski slopes, zip wires, tree top high-wire courses, Bear Grylls Survival Academy, an aqua adventure park, an equestrian centre, mountain biking, BMX and skate parks, a luxury spa, central plaza with shops and restaurants, 100 bed hotel and 500 luxury lodges.

Youth organisations
Port Talbot is home to a number of youth organisations. They are operated by Neath Port Talbot County Borough Council, the Ministry of Defence and a range of other charitable organisations.

Cadet organisations
The 499 (Port Talbot) Squadron Air Training Corps, Sea Cadets, Port Talbot Detachment and Dyfed and Glamorgan Army Cadet Force operate in Port Talbot.

Sea rescue
Port Talbot coastguard celebrated its centenary in 2008. The crew are the mud rescue team for the Swansea Bay area and are one of the seven rescue teams in the Gower Sector. Port Talbot inshore lifeboat is operated by the Royal National Lifeboat Institution and operates in the docks, at Aberafan Beach and in the navigable sections of the local rivers.

Sport

Rugby
The town is part of the Ospreys rugby union region, by which it is represented at the top level of the sport. Other teams include:
Aberavon RFC, (founded in 1876) who play in the Rugby Union Welsh Premier Division
Aberavon Quins RFC, (founded in 1891) who play in the WRU League 1 West
Aberavon Green Stars RFC
Corus (Port Talbot) RFC
Taibach RFC
Neath Port Talbot Steelers, a club which plays in the Rugby League Conference

Football
Cymru South teams are Trefelin B.G.C.,Afan Lido F.C. and Goytre United are based in the town.

Port Talbot Town who were relegated from the Cymru South join Baglan Dragons F.C. who were promoted to the Ardal Leagues.

Other teams in the town are Afan United and Tata Steel FC.

Other sports
Port Talbot Wheelers cycling club
TS Multisport, running and triathlon club of employees from the Tata Steel plants in Port Talbot and Llanwern
Port Talbot Town Cricket Club founded in 1963 and playing in the South Wales Premier Cricket League

Margam Forest to the northeast of the Port Talbot is used as a venue for a stage of the annual Wales Rally GB. In the past, the rally route has traversed Margam Country Park.

Afan Forest Park to the north of the town has a number of dedicated mountain biking trails including the 'Penhydd', 'Y Wâl', 'Skyline', 'White's Level' and 'W²'.

The Aberavon beach is popular for surfing and kite surfing. A local life-saving club operates during the summer months.

Notable people
William "Mabon" Abraham (1842–1922, b. Cwmafan), trade unionist and politician
Bennett Arron, writer, comedian, actor and author, was brought up in Port Talbot 
Martyn Ashton, British mountain bike trials former world champion and multiple British champion, lives in Port Talbot.
Keith Barnes, Australian rugby league player, born in Port Talbot
Captain Beany, celebrity charity fundraiser, and celebrity lookalike.
Robert Blythe, Welsh actor, was brought up in Tan y Groes Street. Played Fagin Hepplewhite in the BBC comedy High Hopes.
Di Botcher, Welsh comedy actress.
Rob Brydon, actor and comedian who was brought up in Baglan, Port Talbot.
Richard Burton was born in Pontrhydyfen, Port Talbot as Richard Jenkins and had his early education in Port Talbot where he met his mentor, Philip Burton.
Gabrielle Creevy, actress who is from Port Talbot
Leondre Devries, part of the singing duo Bars and Melody who came third on Britain's Got Talent in 2014.
Alan Durban, footballer
Ivor Emmanuel, musical theatre and television singer and actor from Pontrhydyfen, Port Talbot.
Peg Entwistle, Broadway theatre actress whose 1932 suicide from atop the Hollywood Sign in Los Angeles tagged her as "The Hollywood Sign Girl" was born at 5 Broad Street, Port Talbot on 5 February 1908.
Professor Sir Christopher Evans, businessman, originally from Port Talbot
Rebecca Evans, soprano, from Pontrhydyfen, Port Talbot
William Evans (1883–1968), writer
Brian Flynn, Welsh footballer, influential in Wales' semi-final run at UEFA Euro 2016
Bernard Fox, actor, born Bernard Lawson
Rhod Gilbert, comedian, lives in Port Talbot
Lateysha Grace, television personality
Regan Grace, professional rugby league player for St. Helens and Wales national rugby league team 
Richard Hibbard, rugby union player (Wales and Lions international)
James Hook, rugby union player, Ospreys and Wales fly-half
Sir Anthony Hopkins, actor, was born and raised in Margam, Port Talbot.
Geoffrey Howe, politician, was born in Port Talbot and spent his early years there. When he was made a life peer in 1992 he chose the title Baron Howe of Aberavon.
Chris Jenkins British, European and World champion powerlifter.
Clive Jenkins (1926–1999), trade unionist
Joseph Kappen, serial killer from Port Talbot who murdered a number of girls in the area in the 1970s
Lloyd Langford, former blacksmith turned comedian was raised in Port Talbot.
Richard Lewis, Esports journalist, born and raised in Port Talbot.
Ronald Lewis (1928–1982), actor
Martyn Lloyd-Jones (1899–1981, b. Cardiff), Calvinistic Methodist minister who ministered Bethlehem Calvinistic Methodist Chapel, Sandfields, Aberafan from 1926 to 1938 prior to teaching at Westminster Chapel in London
Michael Locke, aka 'Pancho' of TV series Dirty Sanchez, was born and brought up in Baglan, Port Talbot
Allan Martin, rugby union player (Wales and Lions international)
Christopher Painter, composer, born in 1962
Colin Pascoe, former Swansea City, Sunderland and Wales international.
Dic Penderyn, was born as Richard Lewis in Aberafan in 1803, in the centre of what is now Port Talbot but before the town was named as such in 1840. He is buried at St Mary's Church, Aberavon, near the centre of the town. He was convicted of assault on an army soldier and executed.
Paul Potts, an opera singer and the winner of Britain's Got Talent in 2007, lives in Port Talbot
Linda Sharp, champion surfer from Aberafan, won the European surfing championships twice, the British surfing championships ten times and the Welsh surfing championships 19 times.
Michael Sheen, Welsh actor was born in Newport but he was brought up in Port Talbot
Rhys Taylor, footballer born in Neath on 7 April 1990.
George Thomas, 1st Viscount Tonypandy was born in Tydraw Street, Port Talbot and was speaker in the House of Commons.
Andrew Vicari, painter was born in Port Talbot.
Freddie Williams, from Margam, was the 1950 and 1953 Speedway World Champion. As of 2013, Williams is the only Welshman to win the championship.

Special environmental protected sites
Port Talbot has several protected sites, including Sites of Special Scientific Interest (SSSI), Special Areas of Conservation (SAC) and a Ramsar wetland site.
Baglan Moors (An important site for lapwings and other birds and for amphibians)
Caeau Ton-y-fildre (SSSI)
Cefn Gwrhyd, Rhydyfro (SSSI)
Cilybebyll (SSSI) 
Coed Cwm Du, Cilmaengwyn (SSSI)
Coedydd Nedd a Mellte (SAC)
Cors Crymlyn / Crymlyn Bog (Ramsar, SSSI, SAC)
Craig-y-llyn (SSSI)
Crymlyn Burrows (SSSI)
Cwm Gwrelych and Nant Llyn Fach Streams (SSSI)
Dyffrynnoedd Nedd a Mellte, a Moel Penderyn (SSSI)
Earlswood Road Cutting and Ferryboat Inn Quarries (SSSI)
Eglwys Nunydd Reservoir (SSSI)
Fforest Goch Bog (SSSI)
Frondeg (SSSI)
Gorsllwyn, Onllwyn (SSSI)
Gwrhyd Meadows (SSSI)
Hafod Wennol Grasslands (SSSI)
Kenfig / Cynffig (SAC), National Nature Reserve)
Margam Moors (SSSI)
Mynydd Ty-isaf, Rhondda (SSSI)
Pant-y-sais (SSSI)
Tairgwaith (SSSI)

See also
 Aberafan
 Bryn
 Cwmafan
 Goytre
 Margam
 Pontrhydyfen
 Sandfields
 Taibach

References

External links

 
 Port Talbot Historical Society
 www.geograph.co.uk : photos of Port Talbot and surrounding area

 
Ports and harbours of Wales
Towns in Neath Port Talbot
Communities in Neath Port Talbot
Rally GB
Swansea Bay (region)
Populated coastal places in Wales
Port cities and towns in Wales